Plan to Achieve Self Support, also known as a "PASS", is a program offered by the US Social Security Administration (SSA) for disabled or blind individuals who receive or qualify for Supplemental Security Income. A PASS's main purpose is to help a disabled individual find employment or return to work.

The requirements for a PASS are the following:

 It must be in writing (using the form on the website)
 The planner must already have an income or resources set aside to pay for the plan expenses
 The plan must state a work goal (i.e a vocational assessment of your their skills and how much they want to grow in the next year; must be attainable)
 The plan must have a reasonable time frame with a projected beginning and end, as well as a detailed calendar of your projected goals
 The plan must include detailed expenses of necessities to achieve the work goal.

References

External links 
https://www.ssa.gov/disabilityresearch/wi/pass.html
https://www.ssa.gov/redbook/?__utma=230172574.1248635382.1437076775.1437399740.1437405029.3&__utmb=230172574.3.9.1437405112042&__utmc=230172574&__utmx=-&__utmz=230172574.1437405029.3.2.utmcsr=search.socialsecurity.gov|utmccn=(referral)|utmcmd=referral|utmcct=/search&__utmv=-&__utmk=206743504 
socialsecurity.gov work Beneficiaries Page

Disability law in the United States
Social security in the United States